Robert Drews (born March 26, 1936) is an American historian who is Professor of Classical Studies Emeritus at Vanderbilt University. He received his B. A. from Northwestern College, his M. A. from University of Missouri and his Ph.D. from Johns Hopkins University. Drews specializes in ancient history and prehistory, in particular the evolution of warfare and of religion.

Works
 The Greek Accounts of Eastern History.  Cambridge, Massachusetts:  Harvard University Press, for the Center for Hellenic Studies, 1973
 Basileus: The Evidence for Kingship in Geometric Greece.  New Haven:  Yale University Press, 1983
 In Search of the Shroud of Turin:  New Light on its History and Origins.  Totowa, N. J.:  Rowman and Allanheld, 1984.
 The Coming Of The Greeks:  Indo-European Conquests in the Aegean and The Near East.  Princeton:  Princeton University Press, 1988.
 The End of The Bronze Age:  Changes in Warfare and the Catastrophe  1200 B.C.  Princeton:  Princeton University Press, 1993.
 (editor) Greater Anatolia and the Indo-Hittite Language Family. Papers presented at a colloquium hosted by the University of Richmond, March 18–19, 2000.  Washington, D.C.: Institute for the Study of Man, 2001.
 Early Riders: The Beginnings of Mounted Warfare in Asia and Europe.  London:  Routledge, 2004.
 Militarism and the Indo-Europeanizing of Europe. London: Routledge, 2017.

External links
 Robert Drews website at Vanderbilt

Living people
21st-century American historians
American male non-fiction writers
Johns Hopkins University alumni
Northwestern College (Iowa) alumni
University of Missouri alumni
Vanderbilt University faculty
1936 births
Place of birth missing (living people)
21st-century American male writers